Cecil is a usually male given name of Welsh origin.

The name was associated with Monmouthshire and derives from the Old Welsh personal name Seisyllt. The name may be related to that of the local Celtic tribe (the Silures) and the successor kingdom (Essyllwg).

Notable people with the given name include:

People

Male
Cecil Banes-Walker (1888–1915), English cricketer
Cecil A. Beasley (1876–1959), American lawyer and politician
Cecil Beaton (1904–1980), English photographer
Cecil Boyd-Rochfort (1887–1983), British racehorse trainer
Cecil Brooks III (born 1961), American drummer
Cecil Calvert (disambiguation), several people
Cecil Clarke (born 1968), Canadian politician
Cecil Clementi (1875–1947),  Governor of Hong Kong, British colonial administrator
Cec Cooper (born 1926), Australian professional rugby league footballer and coach
Cecil Cooper (born 1949), American baseball player and manager
Cecil Cooper (bishop) (1882–1964), English-Korean bishop
Cecil Cooper (priest) (1871–1942), British priest and dean
Cecil Day-Lewis (1904–1972), Anglo-Irish poet
Cecil B. DeMille (1881–1959), American film director and film producer
Cecil Dolecheck (born 1951), American politician from Iowa
Cecil Duncan (1893–1979), Canadian ice hockey administrator
Cecil Fielder (born 1963), American baseball player
Cecil Gordon (1941-2012), American racecar driver
Cecil Grigg (1891–1968), American football player
Cecil Harcourt (1892–1959), British military officer
Cecil Heftel (1924–2010), American politician in Hawaii
Cecil Humphery-Smith (born 1928), British genealogist and heraldist
Cecil E. Johnson (1888–1955), Chief Justice of the Arkansas Supreme Court
Cecil Kellaway (1890–1973), British-South African actor
Cecil Leonard (born 1946), American football player
Cecil Mamiit (born 1977), American tennis player representing the Philippines
Cecil McBee (born 1935), American jazz bassist
Cecil Mountford (1919–2009), New Zealand rugby league footballer and coach
Cecil Parker (1897–1971), English character and comedy actor
Cecil Parkinson (1931–2016), British politician
Cecil Payne (1922–2007), American saxophonist
Cecil Polhill (1860–1938), British missionary
Cecil Potter (born 1888), former professional manager
Cecil Frank Powell (1903–1969), British physicist
Cecil Purdy (1906–1979), Australian chess player
Cecil Rhodes (1853–1902), British imperialist and businessman
Cecil Saint-Laurent, the nom de plume of Jacques Laurent (1919–2000), French writer and journalist
Cecil Sandford (born 1928), British motorcycle racer
Cecil Sandford (footballer) (1874–1946), Australian rules footballer
Cecil Sharp (1859–1924), English folk-song collector
Cecil Spring Rice (1859–1918), British diplomat
Cecil W. Stoughton (1920–2008), American photographer
Cecil Taylor (1929–2018), American pianist and poet
Cecil Taylor (playwright) (1929–1981), Scottish playwright
Cecil Tyndale-Biscoe (1863–1949), British missionary and educationalist, working in Kashmir
Cecil Waidyaratne (1938–2001), Sri Lankan military officer
Cecil Williamson (1909–1999), English screenwriter, film editor, film director and Neopagan warlock
Cecil Womack (1947–2013), American singer-songwriter and record producer
Cecil Charles Worster-Drought (1888–1971), English physician

Female
Cecil Frances Alexander (1818-1895), Irish hymnist
Cecil Arden (1894–1989), American opera singer
Cecil Bødker (born 1927), Danish writer
Cecil Cunningham (1888–1959), American actress 
Cecil Woodham-Smith (1896–1977), British historian and biographer
Cecil Castellucci (born 1969), American writer and musician
Cecil Kishimoto (born 1990), Japanese fashion model

Fictional characters
Cecil, minor character from the NBC soap opera Passions
Cecil, a character from the American animated series Beany and Cecil
Cecil Adams, an author pseudonym in The Straight Dope newspaper column
Cecil Aijima, a character in the anime series Uta no Prince-sama
Cecil Fredericks, a character from the films Night at the Museum and Night at the Museum: Secret of the Tomb
Cecil Harvey (Final Fantasy), character in the Final Fantasy IV video game
Cecil Gershwin Palmer, character in the Welcome to Night Vale podcast
Cecil Stedman, character in the Invincible comics and its television adaptation.
 Cecil Sudo, the protagonist in the anime series Wizard Barristers
Cecil Terwilliger, brother of Sideshow Bob in The Simpsons
Cecil Turtle, Looney Tunes and Merrie Melodies cartoon character
Cecil Vyse, a character from E. M. Forster's novel A Room with a View
Cecil the Geek, a Challenge TV character

Others
Cecil (lion), a lion that had lived in Hwange National Park, Zimbabwe, until being killed by a hunter in 2015

Welsh masculine given names
Welsh feminine given names
Welsh unisex given names
Unisex given names
English masculine given names
English-language unisex given names